Miss World America 1992 was the 4th edition of the Miss World America pageant and it was held in El Paso, Texas and was won by Sharon Belden of Florida. She was crowned by outgoing titleholder, Charlotte Ray of New Jersey. Belden went on to represent the United States at the Miss World 1992 Pageant in South Africa later that year. she finished in the Top 10 at Miss World.

Results

Placements

Delegates
The Miss World America 1992 delegates were:

 Alabama - Kimberly Wesson
 Alaska - Karin Meyer
 Arizona - Maricarroll Verlinde
 Arkansas - Lynde Kayne Bonham
 California - Shannon Stone
 Colorado - Tiffany Riedesel
 Connecticut - Nicole Cocco
 Delaware - Christina Angel
 District of Columbia - Traci Necole Smith
 Florida -  Sharon Flynn Belden
 Georgia - Jennifer Waldroup
 Hawaii - Nadine Atangan Tanega
 Idaho - Lori Easley
 Illinois - Gina Maggio
 Indiana - Lesa Walker
 Iowa - Trina Hoyt
 Kansas - Melissa Hettich
 Kentucky - Ron Ann Frey
 Louisiana - Tisa Payne
 Maine - Leigh Bubar
 Maryland - Jeanne Hangliter
 Massachusetts - Laura Wheeler
 Michigan - Kimberly Snoes
 Minnesota - Jolene Stavrakis
 Mississippi - Misty Byrd
 Missouri - Sara Meyr
 Montana - Sunday Rossburg
 Nebraska - L’Tanya Elliott
 Nevada - Ilene Kanter
 New Hampshire - Kelly Jean Johnson
 New Jersey - Cynde Watson
 New Mexico - Diana Morris
 New York - Heather Quarles
 North Carolina - Shanna Phillips
 North Dakota - Tamara Halvorson
 Ohio - Lisa Allison
 Oklahoma - Lisa Watson
 Oregon - Randee Pienovi
 Pennsylvania - Elizabeth Cebak
 Rhode Island - Kara Bentley
 South Carolina - Reid Swofford
 South Dakota - Jillayne Fossum
 Tennessee - Tiffany Adams
 Texas - Margaret Johnson
 Utah - Jodi Jones
 Vermont - Peggy Corey
 Virginia - Regan Davis
 Washington - Shah-yee Jackson
 West Virginia - Krista Ransbottom
 Wisconsin - Tammy Hornick
 Wyoming - Billie Gene Binning

Crossovers
Contestants who competed in other beauty pageants:
Miss USA
1990: : Karin Meyer (Top 6)
1990: : Elizabeth Cebak
1991: : Maricarroll Verlinde (Top 11; Best State Costume)
1991: : Lori Easley
1991: : Laura Wheeler
1991: : Jillayne Fossum
1991: : Krista Ransbottom
1992: : Sharon Flynn Belden 
1994: : Nadine Atangan Tanega (Top 12)
1994: : Jolene Stavrakis (Top 12)
1994: : Lisa Allison

Miss International
1990: : Nadine Atangan Tanega (2nd Runner-Up)

Miss Hawaii's Answer to the Final Question
Before it could be determined who the winner and runner-ups were going to be, the Final 5 had to answer a final question. The question was "Why are you proud to be an American?". Miss Hawaii World 1992, Nadine Tanega, gained notoriety after her answer to the final question which was:
I am especially proud to be a first generation American and a resident of Hawaii our youngest state. Our nation's pride lies deep within the heart's of its people. America has faith in liberty and justice and we all have faith and believe in ourselves. The United States freedom and opportunity is one of the greatest. We are truly the land of the great. From the rocky shores of Hawaii, to the beautiful sandy beaches of Hawaii, America is our home.
After answering the question the host, Alan Thicke, then makes fun of her by saying:
 It's a wonderfully versatile state you have there.
Tanega's answer to the question also had gained even more notoriety after popular YouTuber PewDiePie, featured a clip of her answer in his YouTube video "TRY NOT TO CRINGE CHALLENGE 2 (w/ MARZIA)". In which him and his wife Marzia react to her answer to the question.

General references

References

External links
Miss World Official Website
Miss World America Official Website

1992 in the United States
World America
1992
1992 in Texas